Luke Cann (born 17 July 1994) is an Australian athlete specialising in the javelin throw. He represented his country at the 2014 and 2018 Commonwealth Games.

His personal best in the event is 81.07 metres set in Townsville in 2017.

International competitions

Season bests
2010 – 65.24
2012 – 74.54
2013 – 76.58
2014 – 79.36
2015 – 68.40
2016 – 79.26
2017 – 81.07
2018 – 77.43

References

External links 
 
 Luke Cann at Athletics Australia
 Luke Cann at Australian Athletics Historical Results
 

1994 births
Living people
Australian male javelin throwers
Athletes from Melbourne
Athletes (track and field) at the 2018 Commonwealth Games
Commonwealth Games competitors for Australia
Deakin University alumni
People from Frankston, Victoria
Sportsmen from Victoria (Australia)